The Elks Building in Anaconda, Montana was a historic building built in 1914.  It is a 3-story brick building that is a contributing property in the Butte-Anaconda Historic District.  It was headquarters of the Anaconda Elks until 1964, when it was transferred to the Knights of Columbus.

See also
 Ancient Order of Hibernians Hall:  Another fraternal hall in Anaconda

References

Elks buildings
Knights of Columbus buildings in the United States
Buildings and structures completed in 1914
Clubhouses on the National Register of Historic Places in Montana
Historic district contributing properties in Montana
National Register of Historic Places in Deer Lodge County, Montana
Anaconda, Montana
1914 establishments in Montana